Backwards E may refer to: 
 Ǝ, a letter used in several alphabets, such as Pan-Nigerian or the African Reference Alphabet
 ɘ, the IPA symbol for the close-mid central unrounded vowel
 ∃, a symbol that is used to represent existential quantification in predicate Logic